Yellepit was an unincorporated community in Benton County, Washington, United States, located approximately three miles southwest of Wallula on the west bank of the Columbia River.

History
The community was named Yellepit in honor of a chief of the Walla Walla tribe who was encountered by the Lewis and Clark Expedition. The community once had a large train depot, water tank and other buildings. In 1953 the community site was inundated by the waters of Lake Wallula.

References

External links
 Yellepit, Washington at Columbia River Images

Unincorporated communities in Benton County, Washington
Northern Pacific Railway
Unincorporated communities in Washington (state)